A gubernatorial election was held on 6 August 2006 to elect the next governor of , a prefecture of Japan located in the Chūbu region of Honshu island.

Candidates  

Yasuo Tanaka, 50, incumbent since 2000, novelist. President of the New Party Nippon, he was also supported by the SDP and JCP.
Jin Murai, 69, is a former veteran LDP lawmaker who has held key posts, including head of the National Public Safety Commission. He was also endorsed by New Komeito.

Results

References 

2006 elections in Japan
Nagano gubernational elections
Politics of Nagano Prefecture